The Copa Perú Femenina (formerly known as Campeonato Nacional de Fútbol Femenino) is currently the second level league competition for women's football in Peru that officially started in 2009. Until 2019 it was the top tournament of Peruvian Primera División Femenina whose winner qualified for the Copa Libertadores de Fútbol Femenino, the South American Champions League. The competition is organised by the Peruvian Football Federation. 

In 2020, the main tournament was renamed as Liga Femenina while the Campeonato Nacional de Fútbol Femenino served as the basis for structuring the second level league competition that was designated as Copa Perú Femenina.

History

Metropolitan women's football championship 
Like the men's tournament, the Peruvian Primera División Femenina began on a regional and amateur basis. On 1996 the Peruvian female football competitions started with the creation of the "Campeonato Metropolitano de Fútbol Femenino" (Metropolitan women's footbal championship) organized by the Peruvian Football Federation and played with sport clubs from Lima and Callao. The champion of the first edition was the team of Club Universitario. On 2000 the club Sporting Cristal became three-time champion by getting the titles of 1998, 1999 and 2000. Later, the team of Club Universitario equaled that record by getting the 2001, 2002 and 2003 titles.

Women's football national championship 
On 2008 the Peruvian Football Federation modified the competition scheme in order to give it a national scope, setting the tournament in three fases: provincial, regional and national. With this new competition format, the tournament was renamed as "Campeonato Nacional de Fútbol Femenino" (women's football national championship), and incorporated the former tournament (Campeonato Metropolitano de Fútbol Femenino) as the Region IV (Lima & Callao) of its regional stage.

Since 2009 the champion qualifies for the Copa Libertadores Femenina. the first champion under this new format was the team of White Star. That same year, the Peruvian Football Federation and the FIFA agreed to incorporate representatives of the Women's football Championship into the FPF Bases Assembly, thus granting them greater participation in the decisions of the governing body of Peruvian football On 2012 the team of JC Sport Girls became three-times champion, while on 2016 the team of Club Universitario de Deportes won the tri-championship for the second time. As of 2017, the Peruvian Football Federation decided to accommodate its calendar to that of Conmebol so that the local women's tournaments would not intersect with the development of the Copa Libertadores Femenina. Until that time, the tournament schedule had no relation to the annual calendar; that is, the national championship of one year was defined the following year.

Format
In the current format, which was adopted in 2008, the champions of the 9 regional leagues meet each other over one week and play out a national champion. The nine teams are put into three groups of three. Each team then has two matches. The group winners and best runners-up meet in the semi-finals. Those as well as the final is contested over one leg only.
In 2012 the final tournament consisted of eight regional champions and four teams from the capital. It is played around October of the year.

List of champions
Below is the list of champions:

As First Division Tournament

As Second Division Tournament

Titles by club

Titles by region

References

External links
 Peruvian Football Federation

Football competitions in Peru
Peru
Women's sports leagues in Peru